Constantin Göttfert (born 1979) is an Austrian writer.

Biography 
He studied German language and Cultural Sciences at the university of Vienna. Göttfert is living in Vienna. He received a number of literary prizes.

Works 
Holzung, short stories, Arovell Verlag, Gosau 2006 
In dieser Wildnis, poetenladen-Verlag, Leipzig 2010 
Satus Katze, C.H.Beck, München 2011 
Steiners Geschichte, C.H.Beck, München 2014

External links 
 http://literaturhaus.at/index.php?id=8703&L=0
 http://www.constantin-goettfert.at

Austrian male writers
1979 births
Living people
University of Vienna alumni